Dennis Walger (born 29 February 1984 in Offenbach am Main) is a German international rugby union player, playing for the RK Heusenstamm in the Rugby-Bundesliga and the German national rugby union team.

His sole international for Germany came on 29 September 2007 in a friendly against Switzerland. He is the brother of Markus Walger, also a German international.

Walger has also played for the Germany's 7's side in the past, like at the World Games 2005 in Duisburg, where Germany finished 8th.

Honours

Club
 German sevens championship
 Champions: 2006

Stats
Dennis Walger's personal statistics in club and international rugby:

Club

 As of 29 April 2012

National team

 As of 19 March 2010

References

External links
   Dennis Walger at totalrugby.de

1984 births
Living people
German rugby union players
Germany international rugby union players
RK Heusenstamm players
Rugby union fullbacks
Sportspeople from Offenbach am Main